White Pine Creek is a stream in Latah and Benewah counties, in the U.S. state of Idaho.

White Pine Creek was named for the abundance of white pine in the area.

See also
List of rivers of Idaho

References

Rivers of Benewah County, Idaho
Rivers of Latah County, Idaho
Rivers of Idaho